The 2017–18 Penn Quakers men's basketball team represented the University of Pennsylvania during the 2017–18 NCAA Division I men's basketball season. The Quakers, led by third-year head coach Steve Donahue, played their home games at The Palestra as members of the Ivy League. They finished the season 24–9, 12–2 in Ivy League play to win a share of the Ivy League regular season championship with Harvard. In the Ivy League tournament, they defeated Yale and Harvard to become Ivy League Tournament champions. They received the Ivy League's automatic bid to the NCAA tournament where they lost in the first round to Kansas.

Previous season 
The Quakers finished the 2016–17 season 13–15, 6–8 in Ivy League play to finish in fourth place. They lost in the semifinals of the inaugural Ivy League tournament to Princeton.

Offseason

Departures

2017 recruiting class

2018 recruiting class

Roster

Schedule and results

|-
!colspan=9 style=| Regular season

|-
!colspan=9 style=| Ivy League tournament

|-
!colspan=9 style=| NCAA tournament

References

Penn Quakers men's basketball seasons
Penn
Penn
Penn
Penn